The Tango 51 is a sniper rifle manufactured by Tactical Operations Incorporated.  The rifle is based on a Remington Model 700 action and chambered for 7.62×51mm NATO/.308 Winchester caliber. The rifle is extremely accurate, with an accuracy guarantee of 0.25 minute of arc (which gives 0.2617 inch spread at a distance of 100 yards, or 7.3 mm spread in a distance of 100 meters).

The Tango 51 was adopted by 400 SWAT and law enforcement agencies worldwide, include the Los Angeles County Sheriffs Special Enforcement Bureau (SEB).

External links
 Tactical Operations Inc. company website
 Tactical Operations - Tango 51
 The Tango 51 - Tack Driving Tactical Rifle from Tac Ops by Eugene Nielsen

7.62×51mm NATO rifles
Sniper rifles of the United States
Bolt-action rifles of the United States